Achmad Nawir (1 January 1911 – April 1995) was a Indonesia doctor and footballer. Nawir played for a local club HBS Soerabaja and also the Indonesia national football team.

Career
He is noted for captaining of the Indonesia national football team while it crashed out in defeat to Hungary at the 1938 FIFA World Cup, 6–0. Curiously, the other captain, György Sárosi, had a doctorate degree, the same as Nawir. Nawir wore his studious glasses for the match. Indonesia automatically qualified for the tournament after their original opponents, Japan, withdrew from the qualifying round. He is one of the few players to wear glasses in the World Cup. Nawir and most of his teammates only played in two international matches, one against Hungary in the World Cup and another against Netherlands, losing 9–2 in a friendly game just after the World Cup. It was the last international match for "Dutch East Indies", which became the independent nation of Indonesia in 1945.

Honours
HBS Soerabaja
 SVB Hoofdklasse: 1935–36, 1936–37, 1937–38, 1940–41

References

Hungary 6-0 Indonesia

External links
 

1911 births
1995 deaths
Indonesian footballers
1938 FIFA World Cup players
Place of death missing
Indonesia international footballers
Association football midfielders